= Lila Lebowitz =

American anthropologist & author

Lila Lebowitz (1930–1984) was an American anthropologist, author, and associate professor at Northeastern University. She served as president of the Northeastern Anthropological Association.

== Early life and education ==
Born in New York City, Lila Shapiro attended Brooklyn College and joined Phi Beta Kappa. She graduated magna cum laude in 1952 and received her bachelor's. In 1959, she graduated from Columbia University with a Master's degree. In 1971, she graduated with a Ph.D from Columbia University.

== Career and research ==
In 1965, she joined the Department of Sociology and Anthropology at Columbia University. Following her Doctoral program, she served as Executive Officer at the university from 1971 to 1976. She then moved to Arlington, Massachusetts. There, she joined the Northeastern Anthropological Association, where she served as president in 1976 and 1977. Lebowitz worked as an associate professor at Northeastern University. During her career, she would work on research that combined her field of anthropology with biology, sociology, and psychology. She researched topics including schizophrenia, IQ, evolution, primate behavior, and most notably, sex roles and division of labor. She was a strong critique of sociobiology and the concept of "the natural superiority of man"

Her research was often explained through her writings. She wrote numerous articles, including "Females, Males, Families: A Biosocial Approach" and "Humans and other animals: A perspective on perspectives". She was published in: American Journal of Orthopsychiatry, American Scientist, American Sociological Review, Anthroquest, BioScience, Boston Globe, Business Week, Culture in History, Current Anthropology, Fortune, Human Behavior, Journal of Human Evolution, Journal of Primatology, Life Magazine, National Institutes of Health newsletter, Natural History, New England Journal of Medicine, Psychology and Social Science Review, Psychology Today, Quoddy Tides, Science News, and Technology Today.

She held memberships in: Boston Genes and Gender Study Group, Sociobiology Study Group of Science for the People, Association of Women in Sociology (AWIS), American Anthropological Association, Anthropology Research Center (Cambridge, Massachusetts; Board Member), and Northeastern Anthropological Association (member and President).

== Personal life ==
In 1956, she married Richard Leibowitz. In 1958, she gave birth to their first child, Karla. In 1960, she gave birth to her second daughter, Jean.

She died in June 1984
